John Andrew Leslie (born 2 August 1940) is a Canadian philosopher and writer.

Biography

Leslie was educated at Wadham College, Oxford, earning his B.A. in English Literature in 1962 and his M.Litt. in Classics in 1968. He is currently Professor emeritus at the University of Guelph, in Ontario, Canada.

In his book Universes, Leslie describes a philosophical parable in which an individual survives a firing squad of fifty expert marksmen unscathed. He offers two explanations for this remarkable event: either it is a fortuitous outcome, to be expected occasionally by pure chance among many thousands of attempted executions by firing squad; or it is intentional. Francis Collins references this parable in his book The Language of God: A Scientist Presents Evidence for Belief as part of his argument that the Anthropic Principle strongly suggests a Creator with intent.

Leslie has spoken as follows about his life's work: What I have to contribute is some technical defense of the idea that if you had an infinitely rich [universe], it could be explained by reference to its value.  Its goodness could be the creative force which had produced it.  I think if I would like to be remembered as a philosopher for any one thing, that would be the thing I'd most like to be remembered for.

Pantheism

Leslie is a pantheist. His philosophical work takes influence from David Lewis, Plato and Spinoza.

In his book Infinite Minds: A Philosophical Cosmology (2001), Leslie argues for a pantheistic universe in which everything exists in a divine mind. Philosopher Brendan Sweetman commented that the book promotes a "highly speculative, pantheistic theory that is fascinating in its own way, but that will probably convince very few." Leslie's book is unique because he accepts and uses arguments for the existence of God which are usually used to support theism such as a version of the cosmological argument and the design argument based on fine-tuning but he explains these in a pantheistic way.

Selected publications

 Value and Existence (1979)
 Universes (1989)
 Physical Cosmology and Philosophy (1990)
 The End of the World: The Science and Ethics of Human Extinction. (1996)
 Modern Cosmology and Philosophy (1998)
 Infinite Minds: A Philosophical Cosmology (2001)
 Immortality Defended (2007)
 The Mystery of Existence: Why is there Anything At All? (2013)
 What God Might Be (2018)

See also
 Doomsday argument — a probabilistic argument that claims to predict number of future members of the human species given only an estimate of the total number of humans born so far.
 Hostage Chess — a chess variant invented by Leslie
 Axiarchism —  A term invented by John Leslie for the metaphysical belief that the world is largely or entirely determined by what is ethically valuable, and that things in this world have an intrinsic desire for the good.

References

External links
 Personal homepage at University of Guelph
 Bio page at the Lifeboat Foundation
 Video of debate/discussion with John Leslie and Jim Holt on Bloggingheads.tv

Living people
1940 births
20th-century Canadian philosophers
21st-century Canadian philosophers
Alumni of Wadham College, Oxford
Analytic philosophers
Canadian ethicists
Metaphysicians
Pantheists
Philosophical cosmologists
Philosophers of mind
Philosophers of religion
Philosophers of science
Place of birth missing (living people)
Academic staff of the University of Guelph